Oskar Gustavson (14 February 1889 Kogula Parish (now Saaremaa Parish), Kreis Ösel – ? December 1945 Tallinn) was an Estonian politician, editor and journalist. He was a member of the I, II, III, IV and V Riigikogu.

1932 to 1937 he was Second Assistant Secretary of V Riigikogu.

References

1889 births
1945 deaths
People from Saaremaa Parish
People from Kreis Ösel
Estonian Independent Socialist Workers' Party politicians
Estonian Socialist Workers' Party politicians
Members of the Riigikogu, 1920–1923
Members of the Riigikogu, 1923–1926
Members of the Riigikogu, 1926–1929
Members of the Riigikogu, 1929–1932
Members of the Riigikogu, 1932–1934
Members of the Riigivolikogu
Estonian journalists
Estonian editors
Estonian people who died in Soviet detention